Kelly Pierce Stephens-Tysland (born June 4, 1983) is an American ice hockey player. She won a bronze medal at the 2006 Winter Olympics.  She participated in women's ice hockey at the University of Minnesota before moving back to her home city of Seattle and starting Experience Momentum, a fitness training company.

References

External links
Kelly Stephens' U.S. Olympic Team bio

1983 births
American women's ice hockey forwards
Ice hockey people from Washington (state)
Ice hockey players at the 2006 Winter Olympics
Living people
Medalists at the 2006 Winter Olympics
Minnesota Golden Gophers women's ice hockey players
Olympic bronze medalists for the United States in ice hockey
Sportspeople from Seattle